The Karshner Museum, also known as Paul H. Karshner Memorial Museum , is a natural history museum located at 309 4th Street NE, Puyallup, Washington.  It is one of the only museums owned by a local school district.

History
The museum was founded in 1930 by Dr Warner M. Karshner and his wife in honor of their son, Paul Hibbert Karshner, who died of polio. Paul was only 17 years of age, just beginning his senior year at Puyallup High School.  It initially consisted of Karshner's private collection of 10,000 items including Native American artifacts.  It has grown to include items from South Pacific islands as well as a Dale Chihuly glass exhibit.

The museum is managed by the Puyallup School District and is an active part of the curriculum through  fifth grade.  It is open during school hours and during monthly "Family Days" on weekends.

Repatriation
In 2009, the museum helped repatriate funerary items from its collections to the Yakama Nation, Confederated Tribes of the Colville Reservation, Washington and the Wanapum Band.

References

External links
Karshner Museum
Puyallup School District museum page
Warner Melvin Karshner Biography

Children's museums in Washington (state)
Natural history museums in Washington (state)
Museums in Pierce County, Washington
Art museums and galleries in Washington (state)
Puyallup, Washington
Museums established in 1930
1930 establishments in Washington (state)